Dedwyddfa is a house in Bryn Goodman, Ruthin, Denbighshire, Wales.  It is a Grade II listed building, dated 1886, built for the Cornwallis-West family of Ruthin Castle.  Its design is attributed to the Chester architect John Douglas.  It is one of a pair of houses, the other being Coetmor which was definitely designed by Douglas.  Both houses had large gardens, and were well placed for access to the railway.

It is described as "a fine example of the Domestic revival style" ..."retaining good character and detail".

See also
List of houses and associated buildings by John Douglas

References

Grade II listed buildings in Ruthin
Houses in Denbighshire
Grade II listed houses in Wales
Houses completed in 1886
John Douglas buildings